Stairway to Heaven is a 2009 Philippine television drama romance series broadcast by GMA Network. The series is based on a 2003 South Korean television series of the same title. Directed by Joyce E. Bernal, Andoy Ranay and Mac Alejandre, it stars Dingdong Dantes and Rhian Ramos. It premiered on September 14, 2009, on the network's Telebabad line up replacing Adik Sa'Yo. The series concluded on December 11, 2009, with a total of 65 episodes.

The series was released on DVD by GMA Home Video and is streaming online on YouTube.

Cast and characters

Lead cast
 Dingdong Dantes as Pocholo "Cholo" Fuentebella
 Rhian Ramos as Jodi Reyes-Fuentebella / Jenna Cruz

Supporting cast
 TJ Trinidad as Tristan Aragon / Charlie Matias
 Glaiza de Castro as Eunice Aragon
 Sandy Andolong as Zoila Fuentebella
 Jestoni Alarcon as Jovan Reyes
 Jean Garcia as Maita Aragon-Reyes
 Soliman Cruz as Dindo Aragon
 Karen delos Reyes as Bernadette "Badet" Mallari
 Carlo Gonzalez as Enrico
 Paul Holmes as John
 Say Alonzo as Sheryl
 Ricci Chan as Giorgio

Guest cast
 Joshua Dionisio as young Cholo 
 Barbie Forteza as young Jodi 
 Jhake Vargas as young Tristan
 Jhoana Marie Tan as young Eunice
 Mosang as Violet
 Nonie Buencamino as Rodolfo

Ratings
According to AGB Nielsen Philippines' Mega Manila household television ratings, the pilot episode of Stairway to Heaven earned a 33.5% rating. While the final episode scored a 30.7% rating.

Accolades

References

External links
 
 

2009 Philippine television series debuts
2009 Philippine television series endings
Filipino-language television shows
GMA Network drama series
Philippine romance television series
Philippine television series based on South Korean television series
Television shows set in the Philippines